The Gibalta rail accident occurred on 31 March 1952, on the Linha de Cascais (Cascais line) in Portugal.  It was a derailment due to landslides caused by adverse weather conditions and the bad conservation status of the surrounding land.  The accident resulted in 10 dead and 38 injured.

References

Derailments in Portugal
Railway accidents in 1952
1952 in Portugal
Oeiras, Portugal
March 1952 events in Europe